Obrakyere is a town in the Central Region of Ghana. The town is known for the Obrakyere Secondary Technical School.  The school is a second cycle institution.

References

Populated places in the Central Region (Ghana)